On 3 September 2019, the British Conservative Party withdrew the whip from 21 of its MPs who had supported an emergency motion to allow the House of Commons to undertake proceedings on the European Union (Withdrawal) (No. 6) Bill on 4 September. In the hours after the vote, the Chief Whip Mark Spencer informed the rebel MPs that they were no longer entitled to sit as Conservatives. This led to the loss of the Conservative/DUP majority in the Commons.

The suspended MPs included two former Chancellors of the Exchequer (Philip Hammond and the Father of the House, Kenneth Clarke), seven other former Cabinet members (Greg Clark, David Gauke, Justine Greening, Dominic Grieve, Oliver Letwin, Caroline Nokes and Rory Stewart), and 12 others including Nicholas Soames, grandson of Winston Churchill.

On 29 October 2019, 10 of the suspended MPs had the whip restored. Six stood down at the December 2019 election, while four contested it as Conservative candidates; all four retained their seats. Of the 11 who remained suspended, six declined to stand at the election, while five stood as independents or Liberal Democrats; all five lost their seats.

The suspension of these MPs bore resemblance to the Maastricht Rebels who had the Conservative whip removed by the governing Conservative Party during the ratification of the Maastricht Treaty in the early 1990s.

Background 
In April 2019, Speaker of the House of Commons John Bercow allowed Sir Oliver Letwin to table a motion that would allow MPs to undertake proceedings on the second reading, committee, and third reading of the European Union (Withdrawal) (No. 5) Bill (also known as the Cooper–Letwin Bill) in one day. The motion was passed by one vote. Subsequently, the bill was passed as the European Union (Withdrawal) Act 2019.

Several of the MPs had voted for Theresa May's ultimately unsuccessful Withdrawal Agreement, and subsequently continued to oppose a "no deal" Brexit scenario. They became known in the media as the "Gaukeward Squad" after their informal leader David Gauke.

In September 2019, Bercow again permitted Letwin to introduce a motion under Standing Order No. 24 (SO No. 24) to take control of parliamentary business away from the government, this time to allow for the passage of the European Union (Withdrawal) (No. 6) Bill, to be introduced by Hilary Benn on the following day. In anticipation of the vote, the government whips' office announced that voting in favour of Letwin's motion would effectively be "destroying the government's negotiating position and handing control of parliament to Jeremy Corbyn." On that basis, those Conservative MPs supporting the motion would have the whip withdrawn.

Rebel MPs 
A total of 21 Conservative MPs voted for the motion:

Aftermath 
On 5 September, the Universities Minister Jo Johnson, who is also the Prime Minister Boris Johnson's younger brother, resigned from the Cabinet and stood down as an MP at the subsequent general election. The Daily Telegraph reported that Johnson's decision had been triggered by the suspension of Conservative MPs two days prior.

Two days later, the Work and Pensions Secretary Amber Rudd resigned from the Cabinet and surrendered the Conservative whip in Parliament in protest at Boris Johnson's policy on Brexit and the treatment of the 21 rebel MPs.

On 9 September, the bill was passed as the European Union (Withdrawal) (No. 2) Act 2019.

On 14 September, former Conservative leadership contender Sam Gyimah, who was one of the 21, joined the Liberal Democrats. On 4 October, former Cabinet minister and former Conservative leadership contender Rory Stewart resigned from the Conservative Party, in order to stand as an independent candidate for Mayor of London.

On 29 October, 10 of the MPs suspended from the party in September had the whip restored. They were Alistair Burt, Caroline Nokes, Greg Clark, Sir Nicholas Soames, Ed Vaizey, Margot James, Richard Benyon, Stephen Hammond, Steve Brine and Richard Harrington.

On 31 October, Antoinette Sandbach joined the Liberal Democrats. On 5 November, Philip Hammond stood down as an MP at the forthcoming general election.

See also 
 List of elected British politicians who have changed party affiliation

References 

2019 in British politics
September 2019 events in the United Kingdom
Political controversies in the United Kingdom
Boris Johnson